Herman Joseph Fontenot Jr. (born September 12, 1963) is a former professional American football player who played running back in the National Football League (NFL). He played for the Cleveland Browns and Green Bay Packers.

Biography
Fontenot was born in St. Elizabeth hospital in Beaumont, Texas. He was raised by his Grandmother, growing up in the Neches Homes housing projects in Beaumont, Texas.

He played college football at Louisiana State University.
He played six seasons in the NFL, beginning his professional career in 1985 with the Cleveland Browns. He played his last game in the NFL in 1990.

References

External links
 Pro-Football-Reference.Com
 NFL Enterprises LLC

1963 births
Living people
People from Beaumont, Texas
American football running backs
Cleveland Browns players
Green Bay Packers players
LSU Tigers football players
Ed Block Courage Award recipients